Germany and the Second World War is a 12,000-page, 13-volume work published by the Deutsche Verlags-Anstalt (DVA), that has taken academics from the military history centre of the German armed forces 30 years to finish.

Contents
Germany and the Second World War is the English translation of the series which Clarendon Press (an imprint of Oxford University Press) began publishing in 1990. By 2017, 11 of the 13 parts had been published at a rate of one every two years, although a long delay occurred between the publications of parts IX/I and IX/II after the death of the main translation editor.

In the following table, the publishing dates of the final two parts are yet to be announced by Oxford University Press. The titles and number of pages are based on the German volumes and may change. The volumes are (German title in brackets):

* The first English-language edition of Volume IV also included a separate spiral-bound book of 27 maps in German.

See also
History of the Second World War

References

External links
 Official homepage
 English edition homepage

Books about Nazism
History books about World War II
Military history of Germany during World War II
Series of history books about World War II
German books
1990s non-fiction books
2000s non-fiction books
2010s non-fiction books
Book series introduced in 1979
Book series introduced in 1990